In Greek mythology, a miasma is "a contagious power... that has an independent life of its own. Until purged by the sacrificial death of the wrongdoer, society would be chronically infected by catastrophe."

An example is that of Atreus, who invited his brother Thyestes to dine on a delicious stew, which had been prepared with the butchered flesh of Thyestes’s own sons. As a result, a miasma contaminated the entire family of Atreus, where one violent crime led to another, providing fodder for many of the Greek heroic tales. Attempts to cleanse a city or a society from miasma may have the opposite effect of reinforcing it.

See also 
 Miasma theory
 Panacea (medicine)

Notes

References
 
 

Greek mythology